Governor Lake is a rural community of the Halifax Regional Municipality in the Canadian province of Nova Scotia. It is named after a nearby lake.

External links
 Explore HRM

Communities in Halifax, Nova Scotia
General Service Areas in Nova Scotia